Sovereignty Council may refer to a collective head of state from Iraq or Sudan:

In Iraq
Sovereignty Council of Iraq

In Sudan
Sovereignty Council (1956)
Sovereignty Council (1964)
Sovereignty Council (1965)
Sovereignty Council (1986)
Sovereignty Council of Sudan (2019)